Fountains along with an extensive irrigation network play a great role for Almaty city. Together they create a unified complex of water bodies and streams of the city. Their objective is to irrigate greenery and create a favorable microclimate, especially in hot and dry seasons. Today, in Almaty, there are 10 programs aimed for the city improvement, including "Fountains of Almaty" - "Rivers of Almaty", which aims to develop more than 20 rivers flowing through the city.

Facts 

 First fountain in Almaty was unveiled in 1948.
 Tulebayev Street was once called Fountain Street.
 In total, there are 128 fountains and fountain groups in Almaty, of which 63 are communally owned.
 May 25 has been celebrated as the Day of Fountains since 2005. All fountains of Almaty start working at 9 p.m. this day.
 Fountains are working from May 25 till October 25 from 10 a.m. till 2 a.m. according to the same schedule.

Fountains by city districts

Medeu district 

 Fountains in the park near the bust of D.A. Kunayev
 Fountains at the monument to Dzhambul on Dostyk Ave.
 Fountains at the Hotel "Kazakhstan", northwest side Fountains at the Hotel "Kazakhstan", South side
 Fountain "Oriental Calendar" in front of the Academy of Sciences of the Republic of Kazakhstan
 Fountain "Semirechye" on Tulebayev St., below Abay Avenue.
 Fountains in front of the Palace of the Republic
 Fountain in front of the Museum of the Republic
 Two symmetrical fountains "Mushroom" in front of the city administration building
 Fountain in front of the Kazakh State Philharmonic at Zhambyl at 35, Kaldayakov str.
 Fountains in the Park of Culture and Recreation. Fountain in the center of the pond, "Neptune" fountain, fountain in Greco-Roman theme.

Almaly disctrict 

 Fountain in front of the Kazakhconcert building on Ablaykhan Ave.
 Fountain in front of the Akku Cafe on Panfilov Street
 Fountains in front of the former Government House on Astana Square (East side)
 Fountains in front of the former Government House on Astana Square (North side)
 Fountains in front of the Lermontov Russian Drama Theater
 Fountains in front of the Abay Opera and Ballet Theatre (North side)
 Fountain "Nedelka"
 Fountain "Cascades" (East side) of the Abay Opera and Ballet Theatre
 Fountains near the G. Musrepov Theater for Children and Youth on Ablaykhan Ave.
 Fountains near the monument to Chokan Valikhanov
 Fountain near the Wedding Palace on Abay Avenue
 Fountains "Mother and Child" near the Kazdramteatr building named after M.Auezov
 Fountain at 59 Shevchenko St., corner of Bayseitova St.
 Fountain near the Kazakh-British Technical University on Tole-bi Street, corner of Panfilov Street

Bostandyq district 

 Fountain on Republic of Kazakhstan Square
 Cascade fountain on Kulash Baiseitova Street below the square
 Fountain in the "Orbita-III" microdistrict near the Baikonur cinema
 Fountain in the main square of the Atakent Business Cooperation Center
 Two fountains in front of the Palace of Students of Kazakh National University
 Fountain in front of the MEGA Alma-Ata mall
 Fountain at the entrance to the Park of the First President
 "Singing Fountain" in the Park of the First President of the Republic of Kazakhstan

Turksib district 

 The fountain "Tabigat" in the Park named after S. С. Seyfullin Park
 Fountain in front of the Turksib District Akimat building

References 

Almaty
1948 establishments